Off-pump coronary artery bypass or "beating heart" surgery is a form of coronary artery bypass graft (CABG) surgery performed without cardiopulmonary bypass (heart-lung machine) as a treatment for coronary heart disease. It was primarily developed in the early 1990s by Dr. Amano Atsushi. Historically, during bypass surgeries, the heart is stopped and a heart-lung machine takes over the work of the heart and lungs. When a cardiac surgeon chooses to perform the CABG procedure off-pump, also known as OPCAB (Off-pump Coronary Artery Bypass), the heart is still beating while the graft attachments are made to bypass a blockage.

Off-pump coronary artery bypass was developed partly to avoid the complications of cardiopulmonary bypass during cardiac surgery. The medical community believes cardiopulmonary bypass causes a post-operative cognitive decline known as postperfusion syndrome (informally called "pumphead"), but research has shown no long-term difference between on and off pump coronary artery bypass in patients of lower risk. This is probably because the pump is not the main cause of brain damage, rather it is the embolic process described below.

Sometimes the fatty type materials that collects to form a blockage or line on the walls of an artery may break loose during CABG procedure manipulation.  This debris can result in clots, or “emboli”, that may interrupt the flow of blood to the brain, causing neurological damage or even stroke.  Data analysis from beating heart surgery patients shows a significant reduction in the release of this debris with correspondingly lower stroke rates.

The fatty emboli which cause brain damage are generated when the large artery from the heart (aorta) is manipulated and although these are reduced in most off-pump coronary bypass surgeries they are not  eliminated because the aorta is still used as a site to attach some of the grafts. A growing number of OPCAB surgeons, however, are avoiding the aorta completely, known as "anaortic" or no-touch coronary bypass surgery, by taking all their grafts from sites other than the aorta (e.g. the internal mammary arteries.). This results in a very low risk of stroke, actually less than occurs during  percutaneous coronary intervention.

In addition to off-pump surgery being associated with the clinical benefits of a reduced risk of stroke or memory problems, patients also typically have a faster recovery and shorter hospital stay, fewer blood transfusions, and fewer unwanted inflammatory/immune response issues.

Off-pump surgery can be more technically challenging. The technique has a steep learning curve, but with adequate training and experience,  the quality of the anastomoses has been shown to be similar to on-pump results in surgeons with comparable experience

On February 18, 2012, Amano Atsushi performed a successful off-pump coronary artery bypass operation on Emperor Akihito.

See also
 Cardiac surgeon
 Coronary artery bypass surgery (CABG)
 Minimally invasive direct coronary artery bypass surgery (MIDCAB)
 Percutaneous coronary intervention (PCI), a.k.a. angioplasty

References

External links

 Myocardial Revascularization without Cardiopulmonary Bypass chapter by Todd M. Dewey and Michael J. Mack in Cardiac Surgery in the Adult
 Canadian study to test value of heart-lung machine during cardiac surgery
 Coronary Artery Bypass Grafting With and Without Manipulation of the Ascending Aorta: A Network Meta-Analysis

Cardiac surgery
Vascular surgical procedures